Gary Cennerazzo (born 7 November 1989) is a Scottish former footballer.

Career
Cennerazzo had spells in his native Scotland with Cowdenbeath, Arniston Rangers, Edinburgh City and Spartans. In 2015, he spent time on loan in Sweden with Melleruds IF, before moving to the United States with United Soccer League side Tulsa Roughnecks. After that, he signed for FK Varnsdorf in the Czech second division after impressing on trial in Portugal.

He returned to Spartans in March 2018. and then moved to Lowland League rivals Kelty Hearts in June 2019.

Cennerazzo became captain of Kelty Hearts during their 2019-20 season. This campaign was ended with immediate effect on 13 April 2020 due to the COVID-19 pandemic, with Kelty Hearts being declared champions on a points per game average based on the current standings. During this break in footballing activities, Cenerazzo urged talks on league reconstruction, expressing concern that his side faced missing out on promotion despite their success across the season.

Cennerazzo announced his retirement on 12 July 2020.

References

External links
 Tulsa profile
 

1989 births
Living people
Scottish footballers
Cowdenbeath F.C. players
Arniston Rangers F.C. players
F.C. Edinburgh players
Spartans F.C. players
Melleruds IF players
FC Tulsa players
FK Varnsdorf players
Association football defenders
Scottish expatriate footballers
Expatriate soccer players in the United States
Expatriate footballers in Sweden
Expatriate footballers in the Czech Republic
Lowland Football League players
Scottish expatriate sportspeople in the United States
Kelty Hearts F.C. players